An arms embargo is a restriction or a set of sanctions that applies either solely to weaponry or also to "dual-use technology." An arms embargo may serve one or more purposes:
 to signal disapproval of the behavior of a certain actor
 to maintain neutrality in an ongoing conflict
 as a peace mechanism that is part of a peace process to resolve an armed conflict
 to limit the ability of an actor to inflict violence on others
 to weaken a country's military capabilities before a foreign intervention

Historical examples

Argentina
US President Jimmy Carter imposed an arms embargo on the military government of Argentina in 1977 in response to human rights abuses.

An arms embargo was put in place, along with other economic sanctions by the European Economic Community (EEC), within a week of the 1982 invasion of the Falkland Islands by Argentina, two British dependent territories in the South Atlantic. The European nations ended the embargo after the end of the ensuing Falklands War, and Argentina looked to Western European countries and Israel for arms supplies during the US embargo until it was lifted in 1989.

Indonesia
The US government imposed an arms embargo against Indonesia in 1999 because of human rights violations in East Timor. The embargo was lifted in 2005.

Iran
The United States imposed economic sanctions against Iran following the Iranian Revolution in 1979. However, to secure the release of American hostages, several senior Reagan administration officials secretly facilitated the sale of arms to Iran in the 1980s in a scandal called the Iran–Contra affair. In 1995, the US expanded sanctions to include firms dealing with the Iranian government.

In March 2007, UN Security Council Resolution 1747 tightened the sanctions imposed on Iran in connection with the Iranian nuclear program. The sanctions were lifted on 16 January 2016.

In September 2020, US Secretary of State Mike Pompeo announced the imposition of an arms embargo on the Iranian Ministry of Defence and Armed Forces Logistics and other entities involved in Iran's nuclear program, including the government of the disputed Venezuelan President Nicolás Maduro for providing weapons to Iran.

On 18 October 2020, Iran announced that the United Nations conventional arms embargo imposed on the country in 2007 had expired. The embargo had barred Iran from purchasing arms, including tanks and fighter jets, from foreign nations. The embargo was lifted as per the conditions under Iran’s 2015 nuclear deal with world leaders, despite US objections.

People's Republic of China
The United States and the European Union stopped exporting arms to China after 1989 after the violent suppression of protests in Tiananmen Square. In 2004 and 2005, there was some debate in the EU over whether to lift the embargo.

South Africa
UN Security Council Resolution 418 applied an arms embargo of South Africa in 1977 on dual-use items. The embargo was lifted by Resolution 919 in 1994.

United States
To protest the Vietnam War, Sweden imposed an arms embargo on the United States in 1966. That notably deprived Navy SEALs of the Carl Gustav m/45 submachine gun, which resulted in the creation of the Smith & Wesson M76.

List of current arms embargoes
The countries included in the list are under arms embargo of the UN or another international organization such as the EU and the OSCE and others) or a country. In some cases the arms embargo is supplemented by a general trade embargo, other sanctions (financial), or travel ban for specific persons. In some cases, the arms embargo applies to any entity residing or established in the country, but in others. it is partial with the recognized government's forces and international peacekeepers being exempted from the embargo.

Arms embargo by UN
Central African Republic (by UN), 2013–
Democratic Republic of the Congo (by UN, EU), 2003/1993– (UN/EU)
Iraq (by UN, EU), 1990– (no longer in effect U.N. council brings Iraq closer to end of 1990s sanctions)
Libya (by UN) 2011–
North Korea (by UN, EU), arms and luxury goods, 2006–
Lebanon (by UN, EU), 2006–
Somalia (by UN, EU), 1992/2002– (UN/EU)
South Sudan (by UN) 2018–
Sudan (by UN, EU), 2004/1994– (UN/EU)

Former embargos
Eritrea (by UN, EU), 2010–2018
Iran (by UN, EU), 2006–2020 
Ivory Coast (by UN, EU), 2004–2016
Rwanda (by UN in Resolution 918 and EU) (UN: 1994–2008, EU)
Sierra Leone (by UN and EU), 1997–2010
Yugoslavia (by UN in Resolution 713 and EU) (UN/EU: September 1991)

Arms embargo by others
Argentina (by the United Kingdom) 1982-
Armenia (by OSCE), 1992–
Azerbaijan (by OSCE), 1992–
Cuba (by US), 1958–
Myanmar (by EU), 1990–
People's Republic of China (by EU/US), 1989–
Guinea (by EU), 2009–
Zimbabwe (by EU), 2002–

Former embargos
Syria (by EU), 2011–2013
Turkey (by USA) 1975–1978
Uzbekistan (by EU), 2005–2009
Vietnam (by US) 1984–1995

See also
 Arms control
 Arms Export Control Act (United States)
Arms industry

References

External links
 Hellström, Jerker (2010) "The EU Arms Embargo on China: a Swedish Perspective", Swedish Defence Research Agency
 US Bureau of Industry and Security
 UK Current Arms Embargoes and Other Restrictions
 European Commission CFSP Sanctions
 SIPRI database of multilateral arms embargoes since 1950

Arms control
Embargoes
Peace mechanisms